Čeplje is a Slovene place name that may refer to:

Čeplje, Kočevje, a village in the Municipality of Kočevje, southern Slovenia
Čeplje, Litija, a village in the Municipality of Litija, central Slovenia
Čeplje, Lukovica, a village in the Municipality of Lukovica, central Slovenia
Čeplje, Vransko, a village in the Municipality of Vransko, central Slovenia